Chan Hyung Lee (born August 11, 1992) is a South Korean kickboxer. He is the current RISE Super Featherweight champion.

Kickboxing career

Early career
Lee made his professional debut against Chung Woo Chee in June 2009, winning the fight by decision. He went on to amass a 7-2 record, including a notable victory over Genji Umeno. On the back of these wins, Lee was given a chance to fight Samuel Hadzima at Simply The Best 6 for the WKN Intercontinental Lightweight title. He beat Hadzima by decision.

RISE Super Featherweight title reign
After this title win, Lee would go on to win five of his next eight fights, before signing with RISE in 2017. For his promotional debut, Lee fought Yuki at RISE 118. He won the fight by a second-round knockout. In his next fight, Lee challenged Koudai Nobe for the RISE Super Featherweight title. He beat Nobe by unanimous decision. Lee's winning streak was snapped at RISE 122, as he lost a decision to Hideki.

Lee was scheduled to fight Hikaru Machida at RISE 125. He won by unanimous decision. Lee extended his winning streak with stoppage wins of Hikaru Machida and Yosuke Morii. He then fought a rematch with Yuki at Rise World Series 2019, and won the rematch by unanimous decision.

At the KNOCK OUT 2019 SPRING event, Lee fought Yodlekpet Or. Pitisak for the KNOCK OUT 135 lbs title. Yodlekpet won the fight by unanimous decision. Lee then fought Genji Umeno, for the third time in his career, in the semifinal bout of the 2019 RISE World Series. Umeno won the fight by decision. After losing to Kento Haraguchi in September 2019, Lee fought Suakim PK Saenchaimuaythaigym in December 2019, for the Battle of Muay Thai Super Lightweight title. Suakim won the fight by a third-round TKO.

Lee faced the interim RISE super featherweight champion Kazuma in his first title defense at RISE 160 on July 29, 2022, following a three-year absence from competition. He won the fight by a fourth-round technical knockout. Lee was knocked down in the first round, but was able to build back into the fight by utilizing body shots and low kicks.

Lee faced the #3 ranked RISE lightweight Kan Nakamura in a super lightweight (62.5 kg) bout at RISE World Series 2022 on October 15, 2022. He won the fight by a second-round technical knockout, as Nakamura was unable to beat the count following a knockdown.

Lee made his second RISE Super Featherweight title defense against the #1 ranked RISE contender Hyuma Hitachi at RISE 160 on January 28, 2023. He retained the title by unanimous decision, after an extra sixth round was contested, as the bout was ruled a majority draw after the first five rounds were fought.

Championships and awards
World Kickboxing Network
 2015 WKN Intercontinental Lightweight Champion

RISE
 2017 RISE Super Featherweight -60kg Champion (two successful defenses)

KNOCK OUT
 2019 KNOCK OUT Asia Lightweight Tournament Runner-up

Fight record

|-  style="background:#cfc;"
| 2023-01-28 || Win||align=left| Hyuma Hitachi|| RISE 164 || Tokyo, Japan || Ext.R Decision (Unanimous) || 6 ||3:00 
|-
! style=background:white colspan=9 |

|-  style="text-align:center; background:#cfc"
| 2022-10-15 || Win ||align=left| Kan Nakamura|| RISE World Series 2022 || Tokyo, Japan || TKO (Punches) || 2|| 1:39
|-  style="background:#cfc;"
| 2022-07-29 || Win ||align=left| Kazuma || RISE 160 || Tokyo, Japan || TKO (Referee stoppage) || 4 || 2:55
|-
! style=background:white colspan=9 |
|-
|-  style="background:#FFBBBB;"
| 2019-12-08||Loss||align=left| Suakim PK Saenchaimuaythaigym || BOM 2-6～THE Battle Of Muaythai SEASON II vol.6 || Tokyo, Japan || TKO (retirement)|| 3 || 3:00 
|-
! style=background:white colspan=9 |
|-  style="background:#FFBBBB;"
| 2019-09-16||Loss ||align=left| Kento Haraguchi || Rise World Series 2019 Final Round || Chiba, Japan || Decision (Unanimous)|| 3  ||3:00
|-  style="background:#FFBBBB;"
| 2019-07-21|| Loss ||align=left| Genji Umeno || Rise World Series 2019 Semi Finals || Tokyo, Japan || Decision (Unanimous)|| 3 || 3:00
|-  style="background:#FFBBBB;"
| 2019-04-29 || Loss ||align=left| Yodlekpet Or. Pitisak || KNOCK OUT 2019 SPRING: THE FUTURE IS IN THE RING || Tokyo, Japan || Decision (Unanimous)|| 5 || 3:00
|-
! style=background:white colspan=9 |
|-  style="background:#CCFFCC;"
| 2019-03-10|| Win ||align=left| Yuki || Rise World Series 2019, First Round || Tokyo, Japan || Decision (Unanimous) || 3 || 3:00
|-  style="background:#CCFFCC;"
| 2019-02-11|| Win ||align=left| Yosuke Morii || KNOCK OUT 2019 WINTER || Tokyo, Japan || TKO (Punches) || 2 || 1:21
|-  style="background:#CCFFCC;"
| 2018-12-09|| Win ||align=left| Hikaru Machida || KING OF KNOCK OUT 2018 || Tokyo, Japan || TKO (Doctor Stoppage) || 4 || 2:12
|-  style="background:#CCFFCC;"
| 2018-06-17|| Win ||align=left| Hikaru Machida || RISE 125 || Tokyo, Japan || Decision (Unanimous) || 3 || 3:00
|-  style="background:#FFBBBB;"
| 2018-02-04|| Loss ||align=left| Hideki || RISE 122 || Tokyo, Japan || Decision (Unanimous)|| 3 || 3:00
|-  style="background:#CCFFCC;"
| 2017-11-23|| Win ||align=left| Koudai Nobe || RISE 121 || Tokyo, Japan || Decision (Unanimous) || 5 || 3:00
|-
! style=background:white colspan=9 |
|-  style="background:#CCFFCC;"
| 2017-07-17|| Win ||align=left| Yuki || RISE 118 || Tokyo, Japan || TKO (3 Knockdowns) || 2 || 2:58
|-  style="background:#CCFFCC;"
| 2017-05-14|| Win ||align=left| Rungravee Sasiprapa || ICX Seoul || Seoul, South Korea || KO (Left uppercut) || 1 ||  0:57
|-  style="background:#CCFFCC;"
| 2017-03-26|| Win ||align=left| Tombship Yontong || MKF Ultiamte Victory 03 || Incheon, South Korea || Decision || 3 || 3:00
|-  style="background:#CCFFCC;"
| 2017-03-05|| Win ||align=left| Kodai Nobe || RISE 116 || Tokyo, Japan || KO (Left hook) || 2 || 0:28
|-  style="background:#FFBBBB;"
| 2016-10-30 || Loss ||align=left| Wang Wenfeng || Kunlun Fight 54 || Hubei, China || Decision (Unanimous) || 3 || 3:00
|-  style="background:#FFBBBB;"
| 2016-07-02|| Loss ||align=left| Deng Zeqi || Glory of Heroes 3 || China || Decision (Unanimous) || 3 || 3:00
|-  style="background:#FFBBBB;"
| 2016-04-23|| Loss ||align=left| Keijiro Miyakoshi || Kunlun Fight 43 || China || Ext.R Decision (Unanimous) || 4 ||
|-  style="background:#CCFFCC;"
| 2016-01-23|| Win ||align=left| Jiao Daobo || Kunlun Fight 37 || China || Decision (Unanimous)|| 3 || 3:00
|-  style="background:#CCFFCC;"
| 2015-11-14|| Win||align=left| Daugnkwan Fobbolitox || MKF Ultimate Victory 2015 || Incheon, South Korea || KO ||  ||
|-  style="background:#CCFFCC;"
| 2015-10-03|| Win ||align=left| Samuel Hadzima || Simply The Best 6 || Poprad, Slovakia || Decision || 5 || 3:00
|-
! style=background:white colspan=9 |
|-  style="background:#CCFFCC;"
| 2015-08-29|| Win ||align=left| Son Joon Oh ||  MAX FC 01  || South Korea || Decision (Unanimous) || 3 || 3:00
|-  style="background:#FFBBBB;"
| 2015-08-01|| Loss ||align=left| Motochika Hanada ||  Blade FC 2  || Tokyo, Japan || Decision || 3 || 3:00
|-  style="background:#FFBBBB;"
| 2013-03-20|| Loss ||align=left| Genji Umeno || RISE 92 || Tokyo, Japan || Decision (Unanimous)|| 3 || 3:00
|-  style="background:#CCFFCC;"
| 2013-02-02|| Win ||align=left| Li Ning || K-1 Korea Max 2013 Khan vs Wulinfeng || South Korea || Decision || 3 || 3:00
|-  style="background:#CCFFCC;"
| 2012-12-02|| Win ||align=left| Daiki Nagashima || RISE/M-1MC ～INFINITY～ || Tokyo, Japan || KO (Left hook) || 2 || 0:47
|-  style="background:#CCFFCC;"
| 2012-10-14|| Win ||align=left| Genji Umeno || K-1 World Grand Prix 2012 in Tokyo Final 16 || Tokyo, Japan || Decision (Unanimous) || 3 || 3:00
|-  style="background:#CCFFCC;"
| 2012-04-21|| Win ||align=left| Howlam ||  || South Korea || Decision || 3 || 3:00
|-  style="background:#CCFFCC;"
| 2011-06-17|| Win ||align=left| Kim Jin-hyeok || RISE Korea || Seoul, South Korea || Decision || 3 || 3:00
|-  style="background:#CCFFCC;"
| 2009-05-31|| Win ||align=left| Chung Woo Chee ||  || South Korea || ||  || 
|-
| colspan=9 | Legend:

See also
 List of male kickboxers

References

Living people
1992 births
Bantamweight kickboxers
South Korean male kickboxers
Kunlun Fight kickboxers 
South Korean Muay Thai practitioners
Sportspeople from Incheon